Clitaetra thisbe, is a species of spider of the genus Clitaetra. It is endemic to Sri Lanka.

References

External links
A Revised Phylogenetic Analysis for the Spider Genus Clitaetra Simon, 1889 (Araneae, Araneoidea, Nephilidae) with the First Description of the Male of the Sri Lankan Species Clitaetra thisbe

Araneidae
Endemic fauna of Sri Lanka
Spiders described in 1903
Spiders of Asia